The year 2019 in Japanese music.

Events
70th NHK Kōhaku Uta Gassen

Number-ones
Oricon number-one albums
Oricon number-one singles
Hot 100 number-one singles

Awards
61st Japan Record Awards
2019 MTV Video Music Awards Japan

Albums released

January

February

March

April

May

June

July

August

September

October

November

December

Debuting and returning artists

Debuting groups

A-Jax
ALI
Argonavis from BanG Dream!
Ateez
Ballistik Boyz from Exile Tribe
B.O.L.T
Boyfriend
Beyooooonds
Bis
Carry Loose
CIX
College Cosmos
Dialogue
Dos Monos
DracoVirgo
Girls²
Hinatazaka46
Honest Boyz
(G)I-dle
Iz*One
King Gnu
Mameshiba no Taigun
Oh My Girl
Oneus
Sard Underground
Tebasaki Sensation
The Boyz
Yoasobi
ZOC

Debuting soloists
 Akari Kitō
 Aimi Tanaka
 Eito
 Haruka Fukuhara
 Mayu Maeshima
 Milet
 Sayaka Yamamoto
 Taeyeon
 Toshiki Masuda'
 Vaundy
 Yuuri

Returning from hiatus
 Flumpool
 DuelJewel
 Soulhead
Ran Itō

Disbanding and retiring artists

Disbanding
 Tsuri Bit
 Negoto
 Kalafina
 Janne Da Arc
 Rock a Japonica
 Flower
 Shiggy Jr
 Country Girls
 The Hoopers
 Wake Up, Girls!
 Rhymeberry
 Kinoko Teikoku
 Pentagon
 CocoSori
 Myteen

Retiring
 Boku no Lyric no Bōyomi
 Yūsuke Tomoi
Masako Mori

Going on hiatus
 An Cafe
 Blu-Billion
 Kana Nishino

Deaths
Yuya Uchida dies on March 17.
Michiro Endo dies on April 25.

See also
 2019 in Japan
 2019 in Japanese television
 List of Japanese films of 2019

References